The 1966 Queensland state election was held on 28 May 1966.

Retiring Members
Note: Logan Country MLA Leslie Harrison resigned before the election; no by-election was held.

Labor
Bill Gunn MLA (Wynnum)
Ivor Marsden MLA (Ipswich West)

Country
Eric Gaven MLA (South Coast)

Liberal
Mervyn Anderson MLA (Toowoomba East)
Thomas Hiley MLA (Chatsworth)
Sir Alan Munro MLA (Toowong)
Bob Windsor MLA (Ithaca)

Candidates
Sitting members at the time of the election are shown in bold text.

See also
 1966 Queensland state election
 Members of the Queensland Legislative Assembly, 1963–1966
 Members of the Queensland Legislative Assembly, 1966–1969
 List of political parties in Australia

References
 

Candidates for Queensland state elections